Daniel Nadeau (born 28 February 1954) is a Canadian former sports shooter. He competed at the 1976 Summer Olympics.

References

1954 births
Living people
Sportspeople from Quebec City
Canadian male sport shooters
Olympic shooters of Canada
Shooters at the 1976 Summer Olympics